Joe Amato (born June 13, 1944 in Exeter, Pennsylvania) is an American dragster driver, who won the NHRA Top Fuel championship five occasions and scored 52 event victories, most of them with crew chief Tim Richards. He was the first driver to exceed 260 mph and 280 mph in competition.

Early life and education
Amato began racing cars as a teenager, when he worked at his family's auto parts store.  He dropped out of high school to help run the store when his father had serious heart problems; eventually, Amato built the business into Keystone Automotive, a large and successful automotive wholesaler and distributor.

Racing career

Between 1982 and 2000, Amato finished in the Top 10 every year and, in 1983, earned his first Top Fuel victory in Montreal in 1983. His final career victory came in Reading, Pennsylvania in 2000.

Eye surgery forced him to retire from competitive driving at the end of the 2000 season. He then participated as a team owner until selling the business and retiring permanently in 2005.

Darrell Russell drove Joe Amato's dragster from the 2001 NHRA Winter Nationals until he was killed in an accident at the 2004 Sears Craftsman Nationals at Gateway International Raceway in St. Louis. Morgan Lucas drove the car the remainder of 2004 and 2005, prior to Amato retiring.

On the National Hot Rod Association Top 50 Drivers, 1951–2000, Joe Amato was ranked No. 9.

He currently resides in Lackawanna County, Pennsylvania (Glenmaura, Montage Mountain) and [[West Palm Beach, Florida''. Amato has married three times

In 2008, Amato's record of five championships in the Top Fuel division was beaten by Tony Schumacher, who won his sixth championship that year.

His corporate office is in Wilkes Barre, Pennsylvania.

Awards
He was inducted into the International Motorsports Hall of Fame in 2005.
He was inducted into the Motorsports Hall of Fame of America in 2004.

References

External links
 

1944 births
Living people
People from Exeter, Pennsylvania
Racing drivers from Pennsylvania
Dragster drivers
International Motorsports Hall of Fame inductees